Aspasia Mine and Battery is a heritage-listed mine and stamper battery at Gulf Developmental Road, Georgetown, Shire of Etheridge, Queensland, Australia. It was built from 1916 to 1952. It is also known as Mount Turner Battery. It was added to the Queensland Heritage Register on 13 April 2006.

History 

The Etheridge was an unusually large gold/mineral field and the rushes were widely scattered. The first recorded gold in the district was found by geologist Richard Daintree in 1867 near present-day Georgetown. A series of other gold and base metal discoveries followed and after publication early in 1869 of Daintree's report of discoveries of gold on the Gilbert River, the first rush began. By July 1869 a population of 3,000 were mining the rivers for alluvial gold, and by November 1870 reef mining had commenced. By late 1871, the township of Etheridge (later Georgetown) had a population of 600. The Etheridge Goldfield was proclaimed officially on 18 January 1872, with Georgetown designated the administrative centre.

In 1872 the Durham area, just west of Georgetown, was developed with more than 44 separate auriferous reefs being worked and crushing machinery set up in Georgetown. The Durham Mine worked a rich auriferous reef down to the  level between 1879 and 1899 and again from 1907.

For a short time the Etheridge was one of the richest goldfields in Queensland and in 1885 was still the second highest producer behind Charters Towers. However, due to the isolation, which resulted in high transport costs and scarcity of labour, and with the continuing development of Ravenswood (1868) and the Hodgkinson (1876) in competition, production began to lag behind other fields. Etheridge reefs were small and shallow, yet expensive to develop. The high cost of living meant the population was less likely to settle permanently, so the availability of labour was an uncertain factor. It was, however, known as a reliable standby when other rushes had been worked out.

The Etheridge field peaked as a gold producer in the 1890s but was in decline by World War I. However, high base metal prices during the war turned attention to lead, silver and copper and the field boomed until the onset of the Depression in the late 1920s again caused prices to drop. The 1930s Depression temporarily rejuvenated the Etheridge due to the tendency for gold values to rise during a depression, and unemployment relief funds were provided to assist prospectors.

The most southerly mine, the Aspasia, was worked between 1916 and 1929, during the 1930s and between 1947 and 1952, for gold-silver-lead ore. Silver-lead-zinc ore was first discovered near the site of the Aspasia in 1888, but it wasn't until the World War I boom in base metals that the area began to be mined.

In the aftermath of World War II, production costs rose and after 1950, silver-lead prices fell, leading to the closure of the Aspasia mine in 1952.

Description 
The terrain surrounding the battery is mostly flat with a line of reefs forming a low ridge from the southwest corner to the northeast corner of the site. It is sparsely vegetated with eucalypt and grass and is grazed upon by cattle. On the western boundary the landscape undulates with a series of eroded gullies. At the southeast corner of the site, a large quartz outcrop is visible alongside a station track.

The place contains mine workings, a battery and concentration plant foundations arranged in close association. The main component of the place is an almost intact five head stamp battery set on rendered brick and stone mounts. Concrete foundations for the diesel power plant (which has been removed) are located alongside the stamp battery. Parts of another five head stamp battery are scattered to the south west of the battery area, however there are no foundations to indicate installation of a second stamper. The former hoisting gear over this shaft comprises a light bush timber whip pole and metal pulley. The battery area contains bush timber uprights of varying lengths which formed supports for the battery shed roof, water tanks and belt wheel shafts. Southeast of the stamper are the remains of an elevated tank and tank stand. The stand's timber stumps remain in place, but the corrugated iron tank has fallen and lies between the stumps and an adjacent mineshaft. A line of shallow, open stopes extends northward of the stamp battery from the north edge of the mullock heap.

This feature forms the northernmost point of the heritage boundary.

The two shafts and series of open stopes within the battery area, as well as the shallow pits to the south and north of the battery, are located on the reef line that traverses the site from southwest to northeast.

Some of the tin cans evident in this scatter carried inscriptions on their bases which read "use before 30 Oct 1951", as well as 1950.

Heritage listing 
Aspasia Mine and Battery was listed on the Queensland Heritage Register on 13 April 2006 having satisfied the following criteria.

The place is important in demonstrating the evolution or pattern of Queensland's history.

The Aspasia mine and battery is significant in Queensland's history as an example of a small battery working through the Depression years and until after World War 2 and producing a range of base metals including silver-lead.

The place demonstrates rare, uncommon or endangered aspects of Queensland's cultural heritage.

The compactness of the site and relatively intact state of the stamp battery, haulage gear and water tanks, is rare in North Queensland. The close spatial relationship between the mine and battery is typical of early mining operations conducted on a small intermittently worked scale. Location of a treatment plant on top of a potential mineral resource is today unusual. The very intact timbering in the mine shaft, including the ladder, and the intact whip pole, are rare in Queensland.

The place is important in demonstrating the principal characteristics of a particular class of cultural places.

The stamp battery, haulage gear and water tanks retain the principal characteristics of their type and are important in illustrating the nature of early to mid 20th century mining technology and mining practices for small mines on Northern Queensland mineral fields. The place is significant as a highly legible former mining site in Queensland.

The place is important because of its aesthetic significance.

The place possesses aesthetic significance generated by the strong visual impact inherent in the juxtaposition of remnant mine objects, machinery and workings within an arid, isolated natural environment.

References

Attribution 

Queensland Heritage Register
Shire of Etheridge
Mines in Queensland
Articles incorporating text from the Queensland Heritage Register
Industrial buildings in Queensland
Buildings and structures in Far North Queensland
Mining in Queensland